Opbrakel is a village and deelgemeente (sub-municipality) of the municipality of Brakel. It is located in the Denderstreek in the province of East Flanders in Belgium. It used to be an independent municipality until 1971 when it was merged into Brakel.

Overview
The forest has become a  nature area and varies in height from 65 to 130 metres.

The village was first mentioned in 866 as villa Braglo, and is a Germanic forest name. Opbrakel used to be a heerlijkheid, and used to have a castle named Herenhof which was demolished in 1863. In 1885, a railway station opened on the Zottegem to Ronse railway line. The railway line closed in 1963.

The grist mill Verrebeekmolen was built between 1789 and 1803. In 1909, an electro motor was installed in the windmill, and by 1938 the windmill was no longer in operation. It was repaired between 1996 and 1997. It is in service every last Sunday of the month and open for visitors.

The St Martinus Church is a three aisled basilica-like church with an octagonal tower from the 13th century. The church dates from the mid 18th century. Unlike most churches it is oriented to the north. 

In 1963, the municipality borders were corrected based on language, and the neighbourhood of d'Hutte which used to belong to Flobecq was transferred to Opbrakel. In 1971, Opbrakel was merged into the municipality of Brakel and became a deelgemeente. The village is mainly an agricultural community, but is developing into a commuter's village.

Notable people 
 Serge Baguet (1969–2017), professional road bicycle racer
 Patrick du Chau (born 1959), former cyclist
 Lietbertus ( 1010–1076), bishop of Cambrai and Catholic Saint
 Sandy Martens (born 1972), retired football player

Gallery

References 

Brakel
Populated places in East Flanders